Les Fabuleux Exploits d'Eddy Merckx (The Fabulous Exploits of Eddy Merckx) is a 1973 celebrity comic drawn by Christian Lippens and written by Yves Duval, based on the popularity of Belgian cycling champion Eddy Merckx. It tells the story of his career and is drawn in a realistic style. The book was created for Arts & Voyages Gamma.

Plot
The book starts off with Merckx winning his first amateur championship in Sallanches in 1964 and follows all his conquests, ending with him breaking the world record in cycling (1972) in Mexico.

Sources

Belgian comics titles
Belgian comic strips
Biographical comics
Cycling comics
Comics based on real people
1973 comics debuts
1973 comics endings
Comics set in Belgium
Comics set in France
Comics set in the 1960s
Comics set in the 1970s
Cultural depictions of Eddy Merckx